Mark Andrew Coombe (born 17 September 1968) is a former professional footballer who played as a goalkeeper for Football League clubs Colchester United and Torquay United, amongst many non-league teams.

References

External links

Mark Coombe Career Stats at coludata.co.uk

1968 births
Living people
Sportspeople from Torquay
English footballers
Association football goalkeepers
Bristol City F.C. players
Colchester United F.C. players
Torquay United F.C. players
Salisbury City F.C. players
Dorchester Town F.C. players
Elmore F.C. players
Taunton Town F.C. players
Exeter City F.C. players
Minehead A.F.C. players
Bideford A.F.C. players
English Football League players